XHCCQ-FM 91.5/XECCQ-AM 630 is a combo radio station in Cancún, Quintana Roo, Mexico. It is owned by Grupo Radiorama and carries its La Bestia Grupera grupera format.

History

XECCQ received its first concession on November 28, 1988. It was originally owned by Audio Cultura, S.A., a subsidiary of Radiorama. It became an AM-FM combo in 1994. For many years, it was operated by Grupo Radio Centro using its La Z brand.

In May 2022, La Z moved to XHPBCQ-FM 94.9, which Radio Centro had sold to Rafael Aguirre in 2021, and XHCCQ-FM was relaunched under Audiorama's La Bestia Grupera brand.

References

Radio stations in Quintana Roo
Radio stations established in 1988